Borrero is a family name of Spanish origin. Originally from Leon, Spain, It may refer to:

 Antonio Borrero (1827-1911), Ecuadorian politician, President of Ecuador 1875-1876
 Ariel Borrero (born 1972), Cuban baseball player
 Gloria María Borrero (born 1956), Colombian justice minister
 Ismael Borrero (born 1992), Cuban sport wrestler
 José Ignacio Borrero (1921-2004), Colombian ornithologist
 Juana Borrero (1877-1896), Cuban painter and poet
 Julia Emilia Valdés Borrero (1952), Cuban artist
 Lía Borrero, Panamanian beauty queen
 Manuel María Borrero (1883–1975), President of Ecuador in 1938
 Misael Pastrana Borrero (1923-1997), Colombian politician, President of Colombia 1970-1974
 Ramón Borrero y Cortázar (1824–1895), brother of Antonio Borrero, President of Ecuador 1883-1884
 Yordanis Borrero (born 1978), Cuban weightlifter

Surnames
Spanish-language surnames
Surnames of Spanish origin